Rev. Pandurang Shastri Athavale (19 October 1920 – 25 October 2003), also known as Dada /Dadaji, which literally translates as "elder brother" in Marathi, was an Indian activist, philosopher, spiritual leader, social revolutionary, and religion reformist, who founded the Swadhyaya Parivar (Swadhyaya family) in 1954. Swadhyaya is a self-study process based on the Bhagavad Gita which has spread across nearly 100,000 villages in India, Americas, Europe, Middle East, Oceania and other Asian countries with five million adherents. Noted for his discourses on the Bhagavad Gita, the Vedas and the Upanishads, Dadaji is also known for his selfless work and brilliant knowledge in scriptures.

Early life
Pandurang Vaijnath Athavale was born on 19 of October 1920 in Chitpavan Brahmin Family in the village of Roha in Maharashtra (Konkan), India. He was one of five children born to the Sanskrit teacher Vaijanath Shastri Athavale and his wife Parvati Athavale.

When Athavale was twelve years old, his father set up an independent course of study for the young boy. Thus, Athavale was taught in a system very similar to that of the Tapovan system of ancient India. In 1942, he started to give discourses at the Srimad Bhagavad Gita Pathshala, Madhavbaug, Mumbai", a center set up by his father in 1926.

Athavale read diligently in the Royal Asiatic Library for a period of 14 years; at a young age, he was well known to have read every piece of non-fiction literature (ranging from Marx's philosophy to Whitehead's writings to ancient Indian philosophy). In 1954, he attended the Second World Philosophers' Conference, held in Japan. There, Athavale presented the concepts of Vedic ideals and the teachings of the Bhagavad Gita. Many participants were impressed by his ideas but wanted evidence of such ideals being put into practice in India. Nobel Prize–winning physicist Dr. Arthur Holly Compton was particularly enchanted with Athavale's ideas and offered him a lucrative opportunity in the United States, where he could spread his ideas. Athavale politely declined, saying that he had much to accomplish in his native India, where he planned to demonstrate to the world a model community peacefully practising and spreading Vedic thoughts and the message of the Bhagavad Gita. Athavale preferred the company of children over adults. He was often seen holding and caressing young children with love and spreading the messages of the Gita by whispering them into ears. Children around the world wept upon Athavale's passing in 2003.

Swadhyaya Parivar

The philosophy of original Vedic Dharma is the base of this movement.
Swadhyaya Parivar established itself in India in 1978 with adherents meeting every Sunday, where prayers are sung and a video recording of Athavale is played. Swadhyaya, which closely translates to "study of the self" is a process based upon Vedic philosophy, and the members of the Parivar are called "Swadhyayees". Over the years, Athavale's followers have taken the Bhagavad Gita's concepts of Indwelling God and God's universal love, to millions of people: transcending caste, socioeconomic barriers, and religious differences. Athavale personally visited tens of thousands of villages (on foot and rented bicycles), and his brothers and sisters (swadhyayees) went to every house personally and established a selfless relationship with each family and went house to house to spread Gita's thoughts. adherents have followed suit to roughly 100,000 villages across India, and at least 34 nations across the globe. Dadaji  In these villages, Athavale started various experiments (Prayogs) to impart social activism by means of a god-centric devotion, including cooperative farming, fishing and tree-planting projects in the spirit of collective, divine labour (bhakti), somewhat similar to the Antigonish Movement in Canada. Swadhyayees aim to fulfill Athavale's vision of eradicating the world's problems by creating a global family united under the principle of a universal blood maker. He felt that the universality of the Bhagavad Gita allows for it to a guide to all of humanity. As such, its thoughts should reach unto the last person. Today, the millions of adherents can be found on every habitable continent in over 35 countries including the Caribbean, Americas, Asia, Europe, Australia, New Zealand, Middle East and Africa. It is the Swadhyaya Parivar's mission to complete Rev. Athavale's vision of a "Universal Brotherhood under the Divine Fatherhood of God."

Death
Athavale died at the age of 83 of cardiac arrest on 25 October 2003, in Mumbai, India. He was cremated on the evening of 26 October at Tattvagyan Vidyapeeth in the Thane district, where hundreds of thousands of mourners had paid their respects to him over a period of 24 hours. Subsequently, his ashes were immersed at Ujjain, Pushkar, Haridwar, Kurukshetra, Gaya, Jagannath Puri, and lastly at Rameshwaram.

Popular culture
In 1991 Shyam Benegal created and directed the film Antarnaad (The Inner Voice), based on Athavale's Swadhyaya movements or Prayogs, starring Shabana Azmi and Kulbhushan Kharbanda, among others. In 2004 Abir Bazaz directed the documentary Swadhyaya, based on the life and works of Athavale.

Works
 There are multiple books based on Dadaji's pravachan based on Vedic Stotras, The Geeta, and Ramayan. His famous books include Valmiki Ramayan, Geeta Amrutam, Homage to Saints, Prarthana Preeti, Tulsidal, Sanskruti Pujan (describing about the appropriate definitions of culture and dharma), Vijigishu Jivanvad and many more. Written in multiple languages like Gujarati, Marathi, Hindi, and Sanskrit  The Systems: The Way and the Work (Swadhyaya: The Unique Philosophy of Life), by Shri Pandurang Vaijnath Athavale Shastri (Dada).

Awards and prizes 
He was awarded the Templeton Prize for Progress in Religion in 1997 and the Ramon Magsaysay Award in 1996 for Community Leadership, along with India's second highest civilian honour, the Padma Vibhushan Award, in 1999. He also won the Rashtrabhusan award given to him by the FIE foundation for Progress in Religion.

References

Further reading
 Vital Connections: Self, Society, God : Perspectives on Swadhyaya, by Raj Krishan Srivastava. 1998; Weatherhill, .
 Self-Development and Social Transformations?: The Vision and Practice of the Self-Study Mobilization of Swadhyaya, by Ananta Kumar Giri. Lexington Books. 2008. .
 Role of the swadhyaya parivar in socioeconomic changes among the tribals of Khedasan: A case study, by Vimal P Shah. Gujarat Institute of Development Research, 1998. .
 Swadhyay Movement Living Religions: An Encyclopaedia of the World's Faiths, by Mary Pat Fisher. Published by I.B.Tauris, 1996. , Page 109.
 Swadhyaya: A Movement Experience in India – August 2003 Visions of Development: Faith-based Initiatives, by Wendy Tyndale. Ashgate Publishing, Ltd., 2006. . Page 1.

External links 

Swadhyay pariwar Gujarati website
 dadaji.net
 swadhyay.org
Ramon magsaysay site introduction of Pandurang Shastri Athavale
 Templeton award web-site referencing Pandurang Shastri Athavale's work
 An article by a well-known writer Suma Varughese
 By WAVENEY ANN MOORE, Times Staff Writer © St. Petersburg Times, published 29 June 2002
 In rural India, quiet introspection has outward effects By Chhavi Sachdev in Science & Theology News, July 2004

1920 births
2003 deaths
Recipients of the Padma Vibhushan in social work
Templeton Prize laureates
Ramon Magsaysay Award winners
20th-century Indian philosophers
Indian revolutionaries
Hindu revivalists
20th-century Hindu philosophers and theologians
Indian Hindu spiritual teachers
Indian motivational speakers
People from Raigad district
Scholars from Maharashtra